30 Rock is an American satirical television sitcom that was broadcast on NBC. Created by Tina Fey, the series follows the lives of the head writer of The Girlie Show with Tracy Jordan (TGS), Liz Lemon (Tina Fey), the other staff members of TGS, and their network executive, Jack Donaghy (Alec Baldwin).

30 Rock was a critical success, winning several major awards (including Primetime Emmy Awards for Outstanding Comedy Series in 2007, 2008, and 2009), and achieving the top ranking on many critics' year-end best of 2006 and 2007 lists. On July 14, 2009, the series was nominated for 22 Primetime Emmy Awards, the most in a single year for a comedy series. Despite the acclaim, the series struggled in the ratings throughout its run. It broadcast a total of 138 episodes over seven seasons, from October 11, 2006, to January 31, 2013. In addition, a special episode premiered on July 16, 2020.

Series overview

Episodes

Season 1 (2006–07)

Season 2 (2007–08)

Season 3 (2008–09)

Season 4 (2009–10)

Season 5 (2010–11)

Season 6 (2012)

Season 7 (2012–13)

Special episode (2020)

References

External links 
 
 

 
30 Rock